Croatia and Indonesia established diplomatic relations in 1992. Croatia sees Indonesia as one of the largest and the most influential nation in ASEAN, and recognized its potential as the gate to enter ASEAN markets. Vice versa, Indonesia also recognizes Croatian potential as a strategic gate to penetrate Balkans and European Union market. Croatia has an embassy in Jakarta, while Indonesian embassy in Zagreb was established in 2010.

Trade
Croatia seeks to access ASEAN Economic Community in 2015 through its relations with Indonesia. On the other hand, Indonesia sees Croatia as a potential port to enter Balkans region as well as Central European Union market, especially since Croatia has joined the EU in July 2013. The bilateral trade volume in 2011 reached US$67.1 million, and decreased in 2012 to US$30.17 million figures. On bilateral trade balance, Indonesia recorded a US$8.4 million surplus in 2012.

Cooperations
Other than trade, the cooperation also expanded to other sectors, include economics and technical, defence through military industry cooperation, and education through Indonesia-Croatia university cooperation.

See also 
 Foreign relations of Croatia
 Foreign relations of Indonesia
 Yugoslavia and the Non-Aligned Movement

Notes

External links
Embassy Croatia in Jakarta, Indonesia
Embassy of the Republic of Indonesia in Zagreb, Croatia

 
Indonesia
Bilateral relations of Indonesia